French Exit is a 2020 black comedy-drama film directed by Azazel Jacobs, based on the novel of the same name by Patrick deWitt, who also wrote the screenplay. It tells the story of a Manhattan heiress (Michelle Pfeiffer) who moves to Paris with her son (Lucas Hedges) with the little money they have left.

The film had its world premiere at the New York Film Festival on October 10, 2020, and was theatrically released in the United States and Canada on February 12, 2021. It received mixed reviews from critics, although Pfeiffer's performance was praised and she was nominated for the Golden Globe Award for Best Actress – Motion Picture Comedy or Musical.

Premise
The bank seizes all the property of Manhattan heiress Frances Price several years after her husband's death. The close-to-penniless widow and her son, Malcolm, are left with few options. They sell everything in their house  and relocate to a small apartment in Paris owned by Frances’ friend, with the family cat, who happens to be Frances' reincarnated husband.

Cast

Production
It was announced in May 2019 that Michelle Pfeiffer, Lucas Hedges and Tracy Letts were cast in the film, with Azazel Jacobs directing and the novel's author Patrick deWitt writing the screenplay. Danielle Macdonald was cast in October.

Filming
Principal photography began in October 2019, with Paris and Montreal as the filming locations.

Release
In September 2019, Sony Pictures Classics acquired distribution rights to the film. It had its world premiere at the New York Film Festival on October 10, 2020.

On August 20, 2020, the studio scheduled the film to be released on February 12, 2021. In February 2021, it was announced the film would begin a limited release in New York City and Los Angeles on February 12, before going wide on April 2.

It was selected to be presented to Berlin Film Festival in the section Berlin Special Titles.

Reception

Critical response
The website's critics consensus reads: "The smartly written French Exit offers proof that even the most caustic characters can be made entertaining – and even relatable – through a Michelle Pfeiffer performance." According to Metacritic, which reports a weighted average score of 56 out of 100, based on 32 critics, the film received "mixed or average reviews".

David Ehrlich of IndieWire gave the film a "B−" and wrote: "Jacobs doesn't give us much else to hold on to. For all of its touching moments – and a series of closing grace notes that shimmer with a mystical flair missing from the rest of the film – this gossamer-thin adaptation is hampered by the same ambivalence that's haunted [Pfeiffer's character] Frances for so long."

Pfeiffer received critical acclaim for her performance with many critics dubbing it Oscar-worthy and Variety's Pete Dubruge writing that she delivered a role "for which she'll be remembered."

Accolades

References

External links
 
 

2020 films
2020 comedy-drama films
Canadian comedy-drama films
2020 independent films
English-language Canadian films
Films based on Canadian novels
Films based on works by Patrick deWitt
Films set in New York City
Films set in Paris
Films shot in Montreal
Films shot in Paris
Films with screenplays by Patrick deWitt
Irish comedy-drama films
English-language Irish films
Films about mother–son relationships
Sony Pictures Classics films
2020s English-language films
2020s Canadian films